Genuine is the debut studio album by American singer and songwriter Stacie Orrico. It was released by Forefront Records on August 29, 2000 in the United States. Orrico worked Mark Heimermann, Michael W. Smith, Tedd T, and Michael-Anthony Tyler on the album and co-wrote three tracks. Genuine earned generally mixed reviews and peaked at number 103 on the US Billboard 200. The album's first single, "Don't Look at Me," reached number one on the Christian hits radio (CHR) charts for eight consecutive weeks, breaking the record of any previous release on the musical chart.

Critical reception

AllMusic editor Al Campbell rated the album two and a half stars out of five. He found that Genuine "combines [Orrico's] positive Christian convictions with musical inspiration, embracing the pop/urban influence represented by Christina Aguilera and Lauryn Hill. Orrico deals with tricky lyrical issues (insecurity, peer pressure, anorexia) while musically sustaining mainstream crossover appeal." Billboard wrote that Genuine "is a muscular sound that offers lots to get listeners' attention but never obscures the charm of Orrico's voice [...] All in all, this is an impressive debut from a young artist whose talent is sure to extend beyond the current teen-act boom."

Chart performance
Genuine debuted and peaked at number number 103 on the US Billboard 200, setting a record in first-week sales for a Christian female debut, selling 13,000 copies. It also reached number six on the Top Christian Albums. By March 2001, Genuine sold more than 200,000 units in its first six months of release.

Track listing

Personnel
Performers and musicians

 Stacie Orrico – lead vocals (1, 2, 3, 5, 8, 10, 13, 14), backing vocals (1, 3, 10, 14), all vocals (4, 7, 11, 12, 16)
 Michael-Anthony "Mooki" Taylor – keyboards (1, 3, 10, 14), drum programming (1, 3, 10, 14), voice transistor (1), backing vocals (1, 3, 10, 14)
 Mark Heimmernman – programming (2, 5, 8, 13)
 Damon Riley – programming (4, 7, 11, 12), arrangements (4, 7, 11, 12)
 Tedd T – programming (4, 7, 11, 12), arrangements (4, 7, 11, 12)
 Tim Akers – acoustic piano (14)
 Raymond Boyd – keyboards (14), drum programming (14)
 Michael W. Smith – acoustic piano (16)
 Micah Wilshire – guitars (1, 10, 14)
 George Cocchini – guitars (2, 5, 8, 13)
 Tony Palacios – guitars (3, 14), guitar solo (14)
 Lynn Nichols – guitars (4, 7, 11, 12)
 Andrew Ramsey – guitars (4, 7, 11, 12)
 Jackie Street – bass (8)
 David Davidson – violin (2)
 The Love Sponge Strings – strings (4, 7, 11, 12), string arrangements (4, 7, 11, 12)
 Jesse Shacklock – DJ cuts (4, 7, 11, 12)
 Tiffany Palmer – backing vocals (1, 2, 3, 5, 8, 10, 13, 14)

The Nashville String Machine on "Everything"

 Tim Akers – string arrangements 
 Bob Mason – cello 
 Carl Gorodetzky – violin 
 Lee Larrison – violin 
 Pamela Sixfin – violin

Production

 David Bach – executive producer 
 Eddie DeGarmo – executive producer
 Raymond Boyd – co-producer for basic tracks (14)
 P.J. Heimmerman – production manager (2, 5, 8, 13)
 Dion Lopez – production manager (2, 5, 8, 13)
 Mandy Galyean – A&R administration 
 Scott McDaniel – creative direction 
 Susannah Parrish – art direction 
 Julee Brand – design, layout 
 Kristin Barlowe – photography 
 Allen Clark – photography 

Technical

 Ted Jensen – mastering 
 Michael-Anthony Tyler – recording (1, 10), basic track recording (14)
 Robert "Void" Caprio – engineer (2, 5, 8, 13)
 Todd Robbins – engineer (2, 5, 8, 13), mixing (2, 5, 8, 13)
 Marcelo Pennell – recording (3), overdub recording (14)
 Damon Riley – recording (4, 7, 11, 12)
 Tedd T – recording (4, 7, 11, 12)
 Raymond Boyd – recording assistant (1, 10), basic track recording assistant (14)
 Bob Horn – recording assistant (3), overdub recording assistant (14), mix assistant (14)
 Alvin Speights – mixing (1, 3, 10)
 Chuck Zwicky – mixing (4, 7, 11, 12)
 J.R. McNeely – mixing (14)
 Doug Delong – mix assistant (1, 3, 10)
 Shawn Disch – mix assistant (2, 5, 8, 13)
 Trevor Johnson – mix assistant (2, 5, 8, 13)

Charts

Release history

References

2000 debut albums
Stacie Orrico albums
ForeFront Records albums